Rajnagar may refer to:

Places

Bangladesh
 Rajnagar Upazila, a subdivision in Maulvibazar District, Bangladesh

India
 Rajnagar, Bihar, a town in Madhubani District, Bihar
 Rajnagar, Bihar Assembly constituency, the Bihar assembly constituency centered around the town
 Rajnagar, Chhatarpur, a town in Madhya Pradesh
 Rajnagar, Madhya Pradesh Assembly constituency, the Madhya Pradesh assembly constituency centered around the town
 Rajnagar, Birbhum, a town in West Bengal
 Rajnagar, Birbhum (Vidhan Sabha constituency), the defunct West Bengal constituency centered around the town
 Rajnagar (community development block), Birbhum district, West Bengal
 Rajnagar, Tripura Assembly constituency, an assembly constituency in Tripura state
 Rajnagar, Himachal Pradesh Assembly constituency, a defunct assembly constituency in Himachal Pradesh
 Rajnagar, Bhiwandi, a village in Maharashtra
 Raj Nagar Extension, an area in Ghaziabad, Uttar Pradesh
 Rajnagar, Murshidabad, a village in West Bengal
 Rajnagar, Seraikela Kharsawan, a village in Jharkhand